Edward Ellis was Bishop of the Roman Catholic Diocese of Nottingham from 1944 to 1974.

He was born on 30 June 1899 in Nottingham and ordained priest there on 15 October 1922.

On 18 March 1944, Ellis was appointed the seventh Bishop of Nottingham by Pope Pius XII. He received his episcopal consecration on the following 1 May.

Ellis retired as Bishop of Nottingham on 31 October 1974, aged 75, and died on 6 July 1979, aged 80, as Bishop Emeritus of Nottingham.

He was a priest for 56 years and a bishop for 35 years.

External links
 Catholic Hierarchy

1899 births
1979 deaths
Roman Catholic bishops of Nottingham
20th-century Roman Catholic bishops in England
Participants in the Second Vatican Council
English College, Rome alumni